Rinchingpong is an area in the northern part of Kalimpong. This is place known for its view of the Himalayas and two major rivers, Relli River and Teesta River.  It is a favourite place for tourists and visitors of Kalimpong.

Kalimpong
Tourist attractions in Kalimpong district